The  Edmonton Eskimos season was the 61st season for the team in the Canadian Football League and their 70th overall. This was the third season under head coach Jason Maas and the second season under general manager Brock Sunderland.

The team began the season with a 6–3 win–loss record, but after losing six of the following eight games, the Eskimos were eliminated from the playoffs during their week 20 bye after Winnipeg defeated Calgary to claim the final playoff spot. The Eskimos failed to qualify for the playoffs for the first time since 2013, becoming the first Grey Cup hosts to miss the playoffs since the 2016 Toronto Argonauts.

The Eskimos' 9–9 record was actually tied with the BC Lions for the fifth-best finish in the nine-team league, however BC won the tie-breaker by winning the teams' season series and thus claimed the cross-over berth. Although the Eskimos' record was also better than the 8–10 record of the Eastern runner-up Hamilton Tiger-Cats but CFL rules do not allow two teams from one division to cross over.

Offseason

CFL draft
The 2018 CFL Draft took place on May 3, 2018.

Preseason

Regular season

Season standings

Season schedule

Team

Roster

Coaching staff

References

External links

Edmonton Elks seasons
2018 Canadian Football League season by team
2018 in Alberta